East Kingston may refer to:

East Kingston, New Hampshire, a town in Rockingham County, New Hampshire, United States
East Kingston, New York, a hamlet (and census-designated place) in Ulster County, New York, United States
East Kingston, West Sussex, a hamlet in England
East Kingston section of Kingston, Jamaica

See also
East Kingsford, Michigan